Delves Lane is a small village to the south of Consett, County Durham, England. The housing in the area was built as a suburb of Consett, historically providing housing for people working in the former mining and steel industries. The village has one pub: 'The Traveller's Rest'.

An unclassified road passes through the village from the A692 bypassing Consett, linking up with the A691 road between Leadgate and the nearby village of Lanchester. There is a crossroads at the south end of the village, with roads heading north-east to Iveston and south-west to Knitsley.

There is a village hall, which was constructed in 1925.

Education 
Local schools include Delves Lane Infant School, and Delves Lane Junior School. The two schools have recently joined together and are now Delves Lane Community School.

References

External links

Villages in County Durham
Consett